Catopsis nitida is a species in the genus Catopsis. This species is native to southern Mexico (Veracruz, Oaxaca, Chiapas), Central America, Cuba, Hispaniola, Jamaica and Puerto Rico.

References

nitida
Flora of Central America
Flora of Mexico
Flora of the Caribbean
Plants described in 1826
Flora without expected TNC conservation status